Ali Beyg Kandi may refer to:
 Ali Beyg Kandi, Charuymaq
 Ali Beyg Kandi, Varzaqan